Atasi Lafai (born 24 July 1994) is an Australian rugby union player. She made her international debut for Australia against New Zealand in 2018. She plays for the NSW Waratahs in the Super W competition.

Lafai was named in the Wallaroos squad for a two-test series against the Black Ferns at the 2022 Laurie O'Reilly Cup. She was selected in the team again for the delayed 2022 Rugby World Cup in New Zealand.

Personal life 
Lafai is the younger sister of former St. George Illawarra Dragons centre, Tim Lafai.

References

External links
Wallaroos Profile

1995 births
Living people
Australia women's international rugby union players
Australian female rugby union players
New South Wales Waratahs  players